Oier Larraínzar Arzallus (born 6 October 1977 in San Sebastián, Gipuzkoa) is a Spanish retired footballer who played as a central defender.

External links

1977 births
Living people
Spanish footballers
Footballers from San Sebastián
Association football defenders
Segunda División players
Segunda División B players
Tercera División players
Real Sociedad B footballers
SD Eibar footballers
Real Unión footballers
SD Huesca footballers
CD Laudio players